Shipwrecked Among Cannibals is a 1920 American silent travel documentary film directed by William F. Alder, and released by Universal Studios in July 1920.

Production background
The film featured episodes from Siam, Java, and New Guinea plus an apparently fictitious encounter with cannibals on a small island in the South Pacific. Filming among the tribes in Dutch New Guinea was done by William F. Alder and Edward Laemmle, who was the nephew of Carl Laemmle, founder of Universal Studios.

Reception
Under the pretense of being an educational ethnographic film, film producers have often justified exploitative elements such as half-clad natives in South Seas island documentaries. At least one educational publication, which appeared to take the film as fully authentic, suggested that this film could with review be used in schools. Although Shipwrecked Among Cannibals generally received good reviews, it did not do well at the box office.

Preservation status
With no listing in any film archives, Shipwrecked Among Cannibals is a lost film.

See also
Nudity in film

References

External links

1920 films
1920 documentary films
Black-and-white documentary films
Universal Pictures films
American black-and-white films
American silent feature films
American documentary films
1920s American films